This is a list of Italian football transfers for the 2011–12 season. Only moves from Serie A and Serie B are listed.
The summer transfer window would run from 1 July 2011, the end of the 2010–11 season, with a few transfers taking place prior to the season's complete end.

Summer transfer window

June

Notes
 Player officially joined his new club on 1 July 2011.
Players who spent last season on loan were marked in Italic

July

August

Co-ownership

References
General

 
 
 
 
 

Specific

Italy
Transfers
2011